"All Day Long I Dream About Sex" is a song by American recording artist JC Chasez. It was released as the second and final single from his debut studio album, Schizophrenic. The uptempo track was a homage to 80's synth-rock pop music. The single was released in Europe and Australia in August 2004, and in the United States in October 2004.

Background 
The song was composed after Chasez wanted to recreate a Duran Duran and the Killers type of sound. "'All Day Long I Dream About Sex’ is supposed to be loud, fun & obnoxious. I haven’t heard a great party song like a ‘(You Gotta) Fight for Your Right (To Party!)’ or a ‘We’re Not Gonna Take It’ in so long. Something loud & in your face & good for a laugh!'" Chasez said.

Music video
The music video for "All Day Long I Dream About Sex" was directed by Todd Kellstein and produced by Joseph Kahn. The video features footage of JC performing the song alongside a band and dancers spliced with parodies of adult films. A more risqué version was shot for European audiences.

Release and promotion 
Radio was reluctant to play the single due to fear of FCC fines relating to the Super Bowl XXXVIII halftime show controversy. In addition, the music video was not aired on MTV. Chasez said: "'MTV doesn’t want to put it in rotation unless it has radio spins, and radio stations aren’t gonna push a song as hard unless you have MTV playing the video. We all know how that works.'”

In response to the pushback against "All Day Long", Chasez shifted promotion to the ballad "Build My World". The promotional period for Schizophrenic concluded before "Build My World" could officially be promoted as a third single from the album.

Reception 
Despite no promotion in the U.S., the single was well received in the UK and Australia, where it was praised for its "80's electro-dance infused sound". In Australia, where the song was released as the first single off Schizophrenic, "All Day Long" received heavy rotation on radio and TV. The music video, which Australian media said captures the "tongue in cheek humour of the track", received airplay on So Fresh, Video Hits, MTV's Most Wanted, and was Channel V's "Ripe Clip of the Week" in its first week. In American reviews, Len Righi of The Morning Call wrote that "All Day Long" "whips New Order and Human League into an electro-pop parfait". Doug Rule of Metro Weekly wrote that the song has a "fascinating acoustic meets electronica sound and an extended instrumental bridge that glistens with updated '80s synth-pop."

Other versions 
Apollo Zero reconstructed a mashup featuring the instrumentals and background vocals of the Chasez single with Rick James' vocals from "Super Freak", calling it "All Day Long I Dream About Sex...With a Superfreak". Other underground remixes include the Oddesy 9 Remix, the Sleeper Cell Remix, and the Stengaard Radio Mix.

Track listing
 USA Promotional Single
 "All Day Long I Dream About Sex" [Radio Edit with Fade] – 3:35
 "All Day Long I Dream About Sex" [Radio Edit Without Fade] – 4:04

 UK CD1
 "All Day Long I Dream About Sex" [Radio Edit with Fade] – 3:35
 "Right There" - 4:50

 UK CD2
 "All Day Long I Dream About Sex" [Radio Edit Without Fade] – 4:04
 "All Day Long I Dream About Sex" [Tom Neville Radio Mix] – 4:00
 "All Day Long I Dream About Sex" [Camel Riders Filthy Mix] – 7:23
 "All Day Long I Dream About Sex" [Stengaard Remix] – 3:33
 "All Day Long I Dream About Sex" [CD-Rom Video] – 3:35

 USA Promotional 12" Vinyl 
 "All Day Long I Dream About Sex" [LP Version] – 6:05
 "All Day Long I Dream About Sex" [Radio Edit] – 3:28
 "All Day Long I Dream About Sex" [Instrumental] – 6:05
 "Come To Me" [LP Version] – 5:58
 "Come To Me" [Radio Edit] – 3:29
 "Come To Me" [Instrumental] – 5:58

Charts

References

External links
 Lyrics of this song at Lyrics.com
"All Day Long I Dream About Sex" music video on YouTube

JC Chasez songs
2004 singles
2004 songs
Jive Records singles
Songs about dreams
American synth-pop songs